The 1990 CART PPG Indy Car World Series season was the 12th national championship season of American open wheel racing sanctioned by CART. The season consisted of 16 races, and one non-points exhibition event. Al Unser Jr. was the national champion, and the rookie of the year was Eddie Cheever. The 1990 Indianapolis 500 was sanctioned by USAC, but counted towards the CART points championship. Arie Luyendyk won the Indy 500, his first-ever victory in championship-level competition, and the fastest 500 until the 2013 Indianapolis 500.

Al Unser Jr. won a total of six races, one pole position, and had a total of ten podium finishes en route to the championship. He finished 4th at Indy, and won his first career oval race a week later at Milwaukee. He also tied a series record by winning four consecutive races during a stretch in July–August. Unser's victory at the Michigan 500 was his first superspeedway win. Michael Andretti was Unser's nearest competitor, winning five races and four poles. Andretti narrowed Unser's points lead to 37 points with two key victories late in the season. In the second-to-last race of the season at Nazareth, Unser crashed out, giving Andretti a huge opportunity to close the gap. Andretti managed only a 6th-place finish, and could not capitalize on Unser's misfortune. Unser left Nazareth with a 27-point lead, enough to clinch the championship regardless of the results at the season finale at Laguna Seca.

For 1990, Bobby Rahal's team owned by Maurice Kranes merged with Rick Galles's and it became a two-car effort known as Galles-KRACO Racing. Al Unser Jr. and Rahal became teammates, and Rahal got use of the Chevy Ilmor V-8 engine for the first time. Despite the upgrade in equipment, Rahal suffered a snake bitten season in 1990, finishing second five times, including runner-up finishes at both the Indy 500 and the Michigan 500. Despite finishing in the points in 14 races, it was the first season of his Indy car career he failed to win any races, and he managed only a 4th-place ranking in the final championship standings. Other team and driver shifts for 1990 included shake-ups at Penske and Patrick. Emerson Fittipaldi left Patrick Racing to join the Penske, and the original Patrick Racing Team transferred ownership to Chip Ganassi to become Chip Ganassi Racing. Pat Patrick returned with a new team, taking over the Alfa Romeo Indy car effort.

Drivers and constructors 
The following teams and drivers competed for the 1990 Indy Car World Series.

Season Summary

Schedule

- The Toronto race was supposed to run 183 miles, but was shortened by rain.
 Oval/Speedway
 Dedicated road course
 Temporary street circuit
NC Non-championship event
Indianapolis was USAC-sanctioned but counted towards the CART title.

Race results

Final driver standings

Nation's Cup 

 Top result per race counts towards Nation's Cup.

Chassis Constructor's Cup

Engine Manufacturer's Cup

References

See also
 1990 Indianapolis 500
 1990 American Racing Series season

Champ Car seasons
IndyCar